The Rubin class, Russian designation Project 22460 Okhotnik, is a class of Russian border patrol vessels being constructed for the Russian Coast Guard. It is designed to combat surface and airborne targets and threats. It can also conduct patrol and convoy escort duties.

Design
The patrol craft have been designed with a higher degree of stealth than past Coast Guard ships. The patrol craft have a steel hull, with a double bottom and double sides to increase survivability. The patrol craft are equipped with comfortable berthing for the crew, modern architecture and other comforts like a swimming pool. The patrol craft is equipped with the Opto electronic control system SP-520M, which functions as a fire control system for the main gun and can search and track targets during the day or at night and is equipped with a laser rangefinder, the patrol craft is also equipped with the navigational and tactical complex "TRIMS-22460". The patrol crafts armament gives them anti-surface and air defense capability, in the event of wartime mobilization the craft can be up-armed with anti-ship missiles. The ships are degaussed. The ships have a flight deck and hangar for a helicopter or UAV, there is also a stern launching ramp for a small boat. The patrol craft can also carry a 57mm A-220M gun mount instead of AK-630 on the bow.

Ships
Italics indicate estimates

See also
 List of ships of the Soviet Navy
 List of ships of Russia by project number
 
 Project 22160 patrol ship
 Buyan-class corvette

References

External links

Patrol vessels of Russia
Patrol boat classes